Thaicom 5 was a geostationary communications satellite operated by Thaicom. It was used to provide communications services to Asia, Africa, Middle East, Americas, Europe and Australia.

Overview
Thaicom 5 was constructed by Alcatel Alenia Space, and is based on the Spacebus 3000A satellite bus, with a configuration identical to the Thaicom 3 satellite which it replaced. It was originally ordered as Thaicom 4, but sold to Agrani as Agrani 2 before completion. It was completed in 1997, and stored until June 2005 when it was cancelled and sold back to Thaicom.

Thaicom 5 began experiencing technical difficulties in December 2019, causing Thaicom to duplicate some channels, including Korean Central Television, to neighboring satellites.

Launch
The satellite was launched on an Ariane 5ECA carrier rocket, contracted by Arianespace, flying from ELA-3 at the Guiana Space Centre. The launch occurred at 21:09 UTC on 27 May 2006, and placed Thaicom 5, along with the Mexican Satmex 6 spacecraft, into geosynchronous transfer orbit.  At the time, it was the heaviest dual-satellite payload ever launched into geosynchronous transfer orbit, however, this record has since been broken.

Following launch, Thaicom 5 raised itself into geostationary orbit using an S400 engine, with insertion occurring on 3 June 2006. It underwent on-orbit testing, and was positioned at a longitude of 78.5° East for operational service, where it replaced the failing Thaicom 3 satellite. On 2 October 2006, after Thaicom 5 had become operational, Thaicom 3 was moved to a graveyard orbit.

See also

 Thaicom 4
 Thaicom 6
 Thaicom 8

References

External links
International Media Switzerland  Official provider's site

Communications satellites in geostationary orbit
Thaicom satellites
Spacecraft launched in 2006
2006 in Thailand
Satellites using the Spacebus bus